Ascandra is a genus of calcareous sponges of the family Leucaltidae and are found in oceans around the world.

Species
As of 2019, 15 valid species of Ascandra are recognized:
 Ascandra ascandroides (Borojevic, 1971)
 Ascandra atlantica (Thacker, 1908)
 Ascandra biscayae (Borojevic & Boury-Esnault, 1987)
 Ascandra brandtae (Rapp, Göcke, Tendal & Janussen, 2013)
 Ascandra contorta (Bowerbank, 1866)
 Ascandra corallicola (Rapp, 2006)
 Ascandra crewsi Van Soest & De Voogd, 2015
 Ascandra densa Haeckel, 1872
 Ascandra falcata Haeckel, 1872
 Ascandra izuensis (Tanita, 1942)
 Ascandra kakaban Van Soest & De Voogd, 2015
 Ascandra loculosa (Dendy, 1891)
 Ascandra minchini Borojevic, 1966
 Ascandra sertularia Haeckel, 1872
 Ascandra spalatensis Klautau, Imesek, Azevedo, Plese, Nikolic & Cetkovic, 2016

References

 
Clathrinida
Taxa named by Ernst Haeckel